Jasper National Park is a national park in Alberta, Canada. It is the largest national park within Alberta's Rocky Mountains spanning . It was established as a national park in 1930 and declared a UNESCO World Heritage Site in 1984. Its location is north of Banff National Park and west of Edmonton. The park contains the glaciers of the Columbia Icefield, springs, lakes, waterfalls and mountains.

History

First Nations 
The territory encompassed by what is now Jasper National Park has been inhabited since time immemorial by Nakoda, Cree, Secwépemc, and Dane-zaa peoples. Plainview projectile points have been found at the head of Jasper Lake, dating back to between 8000 and 7000 BCE. In the centuries between then and the establishment of the park, First Nations land use has fluctuated according to climatic variations over the long term, and according to cyclical patterns of ungulate population numbers, particularly elk, moose, mule deer, and occasionally caribou. Starting in the 1790s, Haudenosaunee and Nipissing hunters and trappers moved in large numbers to the eastern side of the Rocky Mountains, around the headwaters of the Athabasca and Smoky Rivers in particular, most of them employed by the North West Company. By the time David Thompson crossed the Athabasca Pass in 1810, led by a Haudenosaunee guide named Thomas, there were hundreds of Haudenosaunee and Anishinaabe people living in the region. When Mary Schäffer Warren visited Maligne Lake—known by the Nakoda as Chaba Imne—in 1908, she did so by following a map given to her by Samson Beaver, a Nakoda guide and hunter.

Fur trade 
Jasper National Park's name originates from Jasper Haws, a Maryland-born fur trader who worked for the North West Company. In 1815, Haws took command of a North West Company trading post, built on Brûlé Lake in 1813, which subsequently became known as Jasper's House. In 1830, the trading post was relocated further up the Athabasca River, just north of Jasper Lake.  The site of Jasper House itself was designated a National Historic Site in 1924.

Jasper House was destroyed in 1910, but it gave its name to both the National Park, and the town of Jasper within the Park.

Jasper Park established 

Jasper Forest Park was established by a federal Order in Council on September 14, 1907. The park's establishment was spurred by plans for the construction of a second transcontinental Canadian railway, which was to cross the Rocky Mountains at Yellowhead Pass; Jasper Park was intended to be developed into an alpine resort in the mold of Rocky Mountains Park, with a train station, tourist hotels, and a service town. Collectively, the mountain parks were intended as a sort of wilderness playground for middle-class workers, an antidote to the malaise of modern life. Unfortunately, the vision of wilderness on which the development plan depended was at odds with the presence of long-established Métis homesteaders within the boundaries of the park, many of whom were descended from the white and Haudenosaunee fur traders and trappers employed by the North West Company and the Hudson's Bay Company in the 19th century. In 1909, six Métis families were declared squatters, paid compensation for any "improvements" made to the land, including buildings, ditches, and fences, and ordered to leave the park.

In 1911, Jasper Forest Park came under the administration of the newly established Dominion Parks Branch of the Department of the Interior, under the purview of James Bernard Harkin, at which time the name was changed to simply Jasper Park. Under Harkin, Canada's national parks were to fulfill a dual mandate of wilderness protection and economic development—primarily as tourist destinations. In particular, the Parks Branch expressly forbid hunting in Jasper and the other mountain parks, deprecating First Nations' centuries-long history of subsistence hunting in the region as indiscriminate slaughter of the local game wildlife. Despite the prohibition on hunting, the park and its tourist facilities became a base of operations for wealthy Canadian and American sport hunters for hunting trips further into the Rockies, beyond the prohibitions in place in the mountain parks and the Rocky Mountains Forest Reserve.

In 1930, Jasper Forest Park officially became Jasper National Park with the passing of the National Parks Act. Section 4 of the act further underlined the park's wilderness preservation function, with Canada's National Parks "dedicated to the people of Canada for their benefit, education and enjoyment" and "maintained and made use of so as to leave them unimpaired for the enjoyment of future generations." Ironically, given the mandate its mandate to preserve natural spaces, the act also redefined Jasper Park's boundaries, removing  of land from the park—including Brûlé Lake and Rock Lake—opening the excised area to coal mining and hydroelectric development.

Early tourism and sport 

In 1911, the Grand Trunk Pacific (GTP) laid track through the park and over Yellowhead Pass. That same year, the GTP founded the town of Fitzhugh around the company's railway station; the town was renamed Jasper in 1913. The GTP's route across the pass was followed in 1913 by the Canadian Northern (CNoR). Both Having both fallen into financial difficulty, the two railways were nationalized—the GTP in 1919 and the CNoR in 1923—and eventually merged into the Canadian National Railway (CNR) by an Order in Council. The railway was later followed by a road built between Edmonton and Jasper. The section between the town of Jasper and the eastern gate of the park was completed in 1928, however it took another three years for the Province of Alberta to complete the remaining stretch of the road into Edmonton.

By the time the GTP's railway track cleared Yellowhead Pass in 1911, there were already eight hotels established in Jasper, but they were rudimentary, and did not meet the expectations of the well-heeled clientele to which the GTP advertised. Jasper Park Lodge, the focal point of the GTP's Jasper advertising campaign, would not open until 1922, three years after the company's bankruptcy and only a year before the railway was merged into the nationally owned CNR. Like the GTP before it, Canadian National featured both Jasper park and the lodge prominently in its advertising literature.

From its founding, the town of Jasper, and later the Jasper Park Lodge, served as a hub for a variety of outdoor sporting activities. Even as Mary Schäffer Warren was "discovering" Maligne Lake, outfitters were springing up in the park to rent out equipment and guide hikers and alpinists. The Alpine Club of Canada, formed in 1906 and sponsored through the 1920s in part by the CNR, held seven of its annual alpine camps in Jasper between 1926 and 1950. And while hunting was forbidden within park grounds, the park's facilities served as a base of operations for outfitters and guides who led wealthy hunters on hunting trips into the forest reserves outside Jasper's boundaries.

Internment camps 

In 1916, following the precedent set at Banff National Park, the Government of Canada opened an internment camp for individuals deemed enemy aliens, primarily immigrants from Germany, the Austro-Hungarian Empire, including Ukrainians, who made up the largest affected population, and the Ottoman Empire. The interned men were primarily employed in the construction of a road from the town of Jasper, along the Maligne River first to Medicine Lake, and later on to Maligne Lake.

In 1931, in response to the Great Depression, the government of Prime Minister R.B. Bennett enacted the Unemployment and Farm Relief Act, which allocated funds for public works projects in the national parks. Labourers, many of them laid-off Canadian National Railway workers, were employed on road and bridge projects within the park, for which they were paid 25 to 30 cents per hour, working eight hours a day up to six days per week. In October, 1931, under the auspices of the relief project, construction started on a road between Jasper and Banff, which would ultimately form the basis for the Icefields Parkway.

Internment camps were established again during World War II, when three hundred Japanese Canadians were forcibly sent to three road camps in Jasper. Additionally, 160 conscientious objectors, many of them Mennonites from the Prairie provinces, were interned at Jasper and put to work upgrading the Maligne Lake and Medicine Lake roads, as well as building a road from Geikie to the British Columbia border.

Wildlife 
Mammalian species found in this park are the elk, caribou, moose, red fox, mule deer, white-tailed deer, porcupine, lynx, beaver, marten, river otter, mink, pika, grizzly bear, coyote, mountain goat, bighorn sheep, black bear, timber wolf, hoary marmot, cougar, and wolverine. The most common birds that fly around this park include bald eagles, golden eagles, great horned owls, ravens, grey jays, clark's nutcrackers, spruce grouses, white-tailed ptarmigans, Bohemian waxwings, and evening grosbeaks.

World Heritage Site 
The park was declared a UNESCO World Heritage Site in 1984, together with the other national and provincial parks that form the Canadian Rocky Mountain Parks, for the mountain landscapes containing mountain peaks, glaciers, lakes, waterfalls, canyons, and limestone caves as well as fossils found here.

Geography

Hydrology 
Most of the park's area forms the headwaters of the Athabasca River, which originates in the parks extreme southernmost point at an unnamed lake unofficially known as Columbia Lake due to it being fed by one of the Columbia Icefield's many outlet glaciers. Despite its misleading name, the well-known Athabasca Glacier is actually the source of the Sunwapta River, a tributary of the Athabasca, not the main river itself. Other major tributaries of the Athabasca River that drain large areas of the park include the Maligne River, the Snake Indian River, Rocky River and the Miette River. The northernmost area of the park is drained separately by the Smoky River. Both the Smoky and Athabasca Rivers form part of the Mackenzie River drainage, the largest river system in Canada, which itself is part of the Arctic Ocean basin. The southeast section of the park is drained by the Brazeau River which is part of the Saskatchewan/Nelson River system which ultimately flows into Hudson Bay.

The park is coextensive with the Province of Alberta's Improvement District No. 12.

Attractions

Front country 
Attractions that can easily be reached by road include the Mount Edith Cavell hiking area, Maligne Lake (which features hiking and boating opportunities), Maligne Canyon, Miette Hot Springs, Pyramid Lake, the Jasper Skytram and the Athabasca Glacier, (an outlet glacier of the Columbia Icefield which features snow coach tours). The Marmot Basin ski area is the most popular winter attraction in the park.

Common summer recreational activities in the park include hiking, fishing, mountain biking (in select areas), wildlife viewing, rafting, kayaking and camping. Winter activities include Alpine skiing, cross-country skiing and snowshoeing. Some companies offer dog sled tours in the park.

Back country 
Only a small fraction of the parks area is road accessible. The rest forms a large backcountry area which is largely only accessible by trail. Large areas of the backcountry are rarely visited as many areas' trails are poorly maintained or non existent. Access into the backcountry is most often accomplished by backpacking or horseback and in rare cases kayak or raft.  Popular backcountry trips include the Tonquin Valley, the Skyline Trail, Jones Pass, Jacques Lake and the Fryatt Valley. The remote North Boundary Trail which provided access to the north half of the park is a multiweek backpacking trip. Canoe and kayaking access to the backcountry can be achieved on Maligne Lake.

Road network 
The park contains several major roads, most of which are intended to be scenic routes that provide access to all of the park's front-country attractions. Since a good sample of parks scenery and wildlife can be viewed from the roads themselves, driving them is considered a core part of the park experience.

Highway 16 (part of the Trans-Canada Highway and Yellowhead Highway systems) is the main route through the park and is the only major east–west corridor crossing the mountains in that area. It serves as both an important trade and travel corridor for through traffic and a tourist route allowing visitors to access and view many of the park's attractions.

The Icefields Parkway (also known as Highway 93) is a highway  in length running from Lake Louise, Alberta, in Banff National Park, to Jasper, Alberta, where it meets Highway 16. The scenic highway runs parallel to the continental divide, providing motor and cycle access to the heart of the Canadian Rockies and is considered to one of the park's main attractions. Along its length the parkway has many viewpoints, tourist attractions, hikes and campgrounds. The Athabasca and Sunwapta Falls are both accessible by the road. In May 2014, Glacier Sky Walk opened to the public. It is glass-floored observation platform  over the Sunwapta Valley. Unlike Highway 16, the Icefields Parkway is strictly a tourist route, and all freight traffic is prohibited from using the road. All users must have a parks pass.

It is the park's other major tourist road (besides the Icefields Parkway). It is not as well known as the Icefields Parkway, but provides several viewpoints and access to hiking routes such as the Maligne Canyon trails. The road has a speed limit of  due to frequent wildlife.

Edith Cavell Road is a  scenic park road that provides access to the Edith Cavell meadow area from the Icefields Parkway. This road is open only between May and October, and RVs are prohibited due to its tight switchback corners.

Miette Hot Spings Road is a  scenic park road that runs from Highway 16 to the Miette Hot Springs, one of the parks core attractions.

Alberta Highway 93A is a  parallel road to the Icefields Parkway that provides access to several hikes, campgrounds and the Marmot Basin Ski Resort.

Marmot Basin Road provides access to the Marmot Basin Ski Area and several trailheads from Highway 93A

Celestine Lake Road is a long gravel road that runs along the north bank of the Athabasca River providing access to several remote trailheads.

Pyramid Lake Road is short road that provides tourists access to the several lakes and resorts just north of Jasper.

Climate

In popular culture 

Jasper National Park is featured in the 2010 3D animated comedy-drama film Alpha and Omega as the location the two wolf protagonists are taken from and struggle to return to.

A KLM Boeing 777-300 is named after Jasper National Park.

"Do not let moose lick your car" was posted on roads around the park in 2020. Moose liked to lick the salt off their cars which was dangerous for motorists and for the moose if they linger on the highways.

See also 

 Dark-sky preserve
 Ecology of the Rocky Mountains
 Jasper Palisade
 List of national parks of Canada
 List of historic places in Alberta's Rockies
 List of trails in Alberta
 List of mountains of Alberta
 List of waterfalls of Alberta
 Wildlife of Canada

References

Works cited

External links 

 
 Tourism Jasper. Tourism Jasper

 
National parks of the Rocky Mountains
Protected areas established in 1907
History of the Rocky Mountains